Ganesh Janardhanan, also known by his stage name VTV Ganesh is an Indian actor, comedian and film producer. He is best known for his hoarse voice, and his appearances in films featuring Silambarasan. He had made his debut in Tamil movie Red (2002) directed by Singampuli. He is very much known for his movie Vinnaithaandi Varuvaayaa (2010) directed by Gautham Menon.

Career

Prior to VTV, he played small roles in films like Red (2002), Vettaiyaadu Vilaiyaadu (2006), Pachaikili Muthucharam (2007) and Vaaranam Aayiram (2008).

Ganesh made his breakthrough with a role in his home production Vinnaithaandi Varuvaaya (2010) directed by Gautham Vasudev Menon starring Silambarasan and Trisha Krishnan. His portrayal of Ganesh, the fictional cinematographer of Vinaithaandi Varuvaiya (2010) won plaudits from critics and eventually led to him changing his name by adding a prefix with the initials of the film (VTV). He went on to play a comic role in the anthology film, Vaanam (2011) which he also produced, portraying the character of "Bajanai" Ganesh who assists Cable Raja played Silambarasan. Ganesh also acted in Osthe (2011) featuring Silambarasan in a role as the heroine's father. In 2012, Ganesh played the role of Silambaran’s uncle in Vignesh Shivan’s romantic musical film, Podaa Podi and bagged two nominations for Best Comedian at the Vijay Award and SIIMA Award. He was one of the lead characters in Naveena Saraswathi Sabatham (2013). In 2014, he starred, penned, and produced Vincent Selva’s comedy film, Inga Enna Solluthu. He was later cast in few more films including Kappal (2014), Romeo Juliet (2015), Vaalu (2015), Vaaliba Raja (2016), Motta Shiva Ketta Shiva (2017) and Sakka Podu Podu Raja (2017). He also acted in Vijay starrer Beast (2022) and Varisu (2023).

Filmography

As actor

As producer

As singer

Music videos

References

External links 
 
 VTV Ganesh on Moviebuff

Living people
Indian male film actors
Male actors in Tamil cinema
Tamil comedians
Indian film producers
Tamil film producers
1961 births